Panfilovo is a former airbase of the Russian Air Force located near to Kalmanka, Altai Krai, Russia.

The base was home to the 44th Training Aviation Regiment between 1967 and 1999 under the Barnaul Higher Military Aviation School of Pilots.

References

Russian Air Force bases
Soviet Air Force bases